This is a list of people and other topics appearing on the cover of Time magazine in the 1950s. Time was first published in 1923. As Time became established as one of the United States' leading news magazines, an appearance on the cover of Time became an indicator of notability, fame or notoriety. Such features were accompanied by articles.

For other decades, see Lists of covers of Time magazine.

1950

January 2 –  Winston Churchill, Man of the Half-Century
January 9 –  Carol Channing
January 16 –  Paul Douglas
January 23 – Mark III computer
January 30 –  Charles W. Sawyer
February 6 –  Clement Attlee
February 13 –  Glenn McCarthy
February 20 –  Kenneth Oberholtzer
February 27 –  Arthur Godfrey
March 6 –   T. S. Eliot
March 13 –  Forrest Sherman
March 20 –  Georgi Malenkov
March 27 –  Clarence Streit
April 3 –  Bhumibol Adulyadej
April 10 –  Ted Williams
April 17 –  Eddie Rickenbacker
April 24 –  Betty Hutton
May 1 –   Gian-Carlo Menotti
May 8 –  Arthur Hays Sulzberger
May 15 – Coca-Cola
May 22 –  Harry S. Truman
May 29 –  Bảo Đại
June 5 – Wall Street Bull
June 12 –  Darryl F. Zanuck
June 19 –  Charles F. Brannan
June 26 –  Pablo Picasso
July 3 –  William Levitt
July 10 –  Douglas MacArthur
July 17 –  Joseph Stalin
July 24 –  Omar Bradley
July 31 –  Walton Walker
August 7 –  K. C. Wu
August 14 –  Edward A. Craig
August 21 –  Yakov Malik
August 28 –  Irving Langmuir
September 4 –  Curtis LeMay
September 11 –  Arthur Radford
September 18 –  Ernst Reuter
September 25 –  Oliver P. Smith
October 2 –  Lucius D. Clay
October 9 –  Robert Frost
October 16 –  Syngman Rhee
October 23 –  Edward Almond
October 30 –  Robert A. Taft
November 6 –  Al Capp, Li'l Abner
November 13 –  George &  John Hartford
November 20 –  Christopher Fry
November 27 –  Hopalong Cassidy
December 4 –  Frank Stanton
December 11 –  Mao Zedong
December 18 –  William H. Tunner
December 25 – Fred Meyer's The Gift

1951

January 1 – American Fighting Man, Man of the Year
January 8 –  Dean Acheson
January 15 –  Rudolf Bing
January 22 –  Paul Douglas
January 29 –  Lester Colbert
February 5 –  Warren Austin
February 12 –  Dwight D. Eisenhower
February 19 –  Charles E. Wilson
February 26 –  Margaret Truman
March 5 –  Matthew Ridgway
March 12 –  Estes Kefauver
March 19 –  Michael DiSalle
March 26 –  Henry Knox Sherrill
April 2 –  Vincent Auriol
April 9 –  Barbara Bel Geddes
April 16 –  Crawford Greenewalt
April 23 –  Harry S. Truman
April 30 –  Douglas MacArthur
May 7 –  Jawaharlal Nehru
May 14 –  James Van Fleet
May 21 –  Juan Perón &  Eva Perón
May 28 –  Frederick Rentschler
June 4 –  Mohammad Mosaddegh
June 11 –  Alfred Whitney Griswold
June 18 –  Zhou Enlai
June 25 –  Sugar Ray Robinson
July 2 – The Pentagon
July 9 –  James Thurber
July 16 –  Matthew Ridgway
July 23 –  David Sarnoff
July 30 –  King Baudouin I
August 6 –  Mario Lanza
August 13 –  John Foster Dulles
August 20 –  Vasily Stalin
August 27 –  Dick Savitt
September 3 –  Ava Gardner
September 10 –  King Farouk I
September 17 – Kremlin Courier
September 24 –  Jean de Lattre de Tassigny
October 1 –  Bert Lahr
October 8 –  William M. Boyle
October 15 –  Louis Finkelstein
October 22 –  Joseph McCarthy
October 29 –  Graham Greene
November 5 –  Winston Churchill
November 12 –  Benjamin F. Fairless
November 19 –  Dick Kazmaier
November 26 –  Ramon Magsaysay
December 3 –  Patrice Munsel
December 10 –   Lila Bell Wallace &  DeWitt Wallace
December 17 –  Henry Cabot Lodge Jr.
December 24 – Madonna and Child in Chartres Cathedral
December 31 –  Groucho Marx

1952

January 7 –  Mohammad Mosaddegh, Man of the Year
January 14 –  Gordon Dean
January 21 –  Andrea Mead Lawrence
January 28 –  Adlai Stevenson II
February 4 –  C. D. Howe
February 11 –  Anthony Eden
February 18 –  Queen Elizabeth II
February 25 –  Robert E. Wood
March 3 –  John Wayne
March 10 – U.S. Taxpayer
March 17 –  Mortimer Adler
March 24 –  Estes Kefauver
March 31 –  Charles Laughton
April 7 –  Eleanor Roosevelt
April 14 –  Fulton J. Sheen
April 21 –  Fulgencio Batista
April 28 –  Eddie Stanky
May 5 –  D. F. Malan
May 12 –  Hoyt Vandenberg
May 19 –  Richard Russell
May 26 –  Lucille Ball
June 2 –  Robert A. Taft
June 9 –  Kurt Schumacher
June 16 –  Dwight D. Eisenhower
June 23 –  Harry Manning of SS United States
June 30 –  John S. Fine
July 7 –  Mark W. Clark
July 14 – Media coverage of political conventions
July 21 –  Bob Mathias
July 28 –  Alben W. Barkley
August 4 –   Philip Murray
August 11 –  John Sparkman
August 18 –  George W. Merck
August 25 –  Richard Nixon
September 1 –  Katharine Hepburn
September 8 –  Muhammad Naguib
September 15 –  G. Mennen Williams
September 22 –  Wallace Harrison
September 29 –  Allan Shivers
October 6 –  Joseph Stalin and  Georgy Malenkov
October 13 –  John Williams
October 20 –   Joyce Cary
October 27 –  Adlai Stevenson II
November 3 –  Dwight D. Eisenhower
November 10 –  Dwight D. Eisenhower &  Richard Nixon
November 17 –  Claire Bloom
November 24 –  Lemuel Shepherd
December 1 –  Alfred Jacobsen
December 8 – Space Pioneer
December 15 –  Gerald Templer
December 22 –  Antoine Pinay
December 29 –  Francis Henry Taylor

1953

January 5 –  Elizabeth II, Woman of the Year
January 12 –  Thornton Wilder
January 19 –  Mamie Eisenhower
January 26 –  George M. Humphrey
February 2 –  Harold Sines Vance
February 9 –  Kwame Nkrumah
February 16 –  Herbert Brownell
February 23 –  Rosemary Clooney
March 2 –  Gwilym A. Price
March 9 –  Syngman Rhee
March 16 –  Joseph Stalin
March 23 –  Georgy Malenkov
March 30 –  Rosalind Russell
April 6 –  F. K. Otto Dibelius
April 13 –  Ezra Taft Benson
April 20 –  Viacheslav Molotov
April 27 –  Bill Bridgeman
May 4 –  Oveta Culp Hobby
May 11 –  Vinoba Bhave
May 18 –  William,  Benson &  Henry Ford
May 25 –  Alcide De Gasperi
June 1 –  Charles Erwin Wilson
June 8 – 3-D movies
June 15 –  Mickey Mantle
June 22 –  Lyndon B. Johnson
June 29 –  James H. Kindelberger
July 6 –  George Washington
July 13 –  Walter Ulbricht
July 20 –  Lavrenty Beria
July 27 –  Cornelius Shields
August 3 –  Allen Dulles
August 10 –  Shirley Booth
August 17 –  Christian Herter
August 24 –  Alfred Kinsey
August 31 –  Konrad Adenauer
September 7 –  Audrey Hepburn
September 14 –  Adolfo Ruiz Cortines
September 21 –  Lewis Strauss
September 28 –  Henri Navarre
October 5 –  Neil H. McElroy
October 12 –  John Foster Dulles
October 19 –  William Jansen
October 26 –   Frederica 
November 2 – Amateur photographer
November 9 –  Johnny Lattner
November 16 –   Igor Sikorsky
November 23 –  Harry Dexter White
November 30 –  Nikita Khrushchev
December 7 –  William F. Dean
December 14 –   Pius XII
December 21 –  Earl Warren
December 28 –  Grandma Moses

1954

January 4 –  Konrad Adenauer, Man of the Year
January 11 –  Hyman Rickover
January 18 –  Richard Nixon
January 25 –   George Balanchine
February 1 –  Harry J. Grant
February 8 –  Nathan Twining
February 15 –  Heinrich Nordhoff
February 22 –  Paul Magloire
March 1 –  Nathan M. Pusey
March 8 –  Joseph McCarthy
March 15 –  Jack Webb
March 22 –  G. David Schine and  Roy Cohn
March 29 –  Jonas Salk
April 5 –  Rab Butler
April 12 – H-bomb mushroom cloud
April 19 –  Henry P. Van Dusen
April 26 –  Briggs Cunningham
May 3 –  Harry W. Morrison
May 10 –  Zhou Enlai
May 17 –  Ray Jenkins
May 24 –  Clinton Murchison
May 31 – Native Dancer
June 7 –  Humphrey Bogart
June 14 –  J. Robert Oppenheimer
June 21 –  Sam Snead
June 28 –  Jacobo Árbenz
July 5 –  John Sherman Cooper
July 12 –  Pierre Mendès France
July 19 –  William McPherson Allen
July 26 –  Willie Mays
August 2 – Do-It-Yourself
August 9 –  Joseph William Martin Jr.
August 16 –  Gina Lollobrigida
August 23 –  Douglas McKay
August 30 –  U Nu
September 6 –  Geoffrey Fisher
September 13 –  Alicia Patterson
September 20 –  Clement Attlee
September 27 –  David Riesman
October 4 –  Arthur Watkins
October 11 –  Marlon Brando
October 18 –  Clifford Case
October 25 –  Billy Graham
November 1 –  Harlow Curtice
November 8 –  Dave Brubeck
November 15 –  George M. Leader
November 22 –  Ho Chi Minh
November 29 –  Bobby Layne
December 6 –  Café Filho
December 13 –  Ernest Hemingway
December 20 –  Benjamin W. Chidlaw
December 27 –  Walt Disney

1955

January 3 –  John Foster Dulles, Man of the Year
January 10 – Bull market
January 17 –  Wayne Morse &  Richard L. Neuberger 
January 24 –  Joseph Dodge
January 31 –   Grace Kelly
February 7 –  Alfred M. Pride
February 14 –  Carl Jung
February 21 –  Nikita Khrushchev
February 28 –  Marcos Pérez Jiménez
March 7 –  George N. Craig
March 14 –  Ichiro Hatoyama
March 21 –  George Meany
March 28 –  Thomas Watson Jr.
April 4 –  Ngo Dinh Diem
April 11 – Mother Mary Columba
April 18 –  Chiang Kai-shek
April 25 –  Walter George
May 2 –  Claire McCardell
May 9 –  Georgy Zhukov
May 16 –  Lee A. Dubridge
May 23 –  Anthony Eden
May 30 –  Goodwin Knight
June 6 –  Josip Broz Tito
June 13 –  Gwen Verdon
June 20 –  Walter Reuther
June 27 –  Dag Hammarskjöld
July 4 –  Dwight D. Eisenhower
July 11 –  Gussie Busch
July 18 –  André Malraux
July 25 –  Nikolai Bulganin
August 1 –  Dwight D. Eisenhower,  Anthony Eden,  Nikolai Bulganin,  Edgar Faure 
August 8 –  Roy Campanella
August 15 –  Willard Libby
August 22 –  Carmine De Sapio
August 29 –  Frank Sinatra
September 5 –  Herman Wouk
September 12 –  John Stapp
September 19 –  Thurgood Marshall
September 26 –  Gamal Abdel Nasser
October 3 –  Casey Stengel
October 10 –  Richard Nixon
October 17 –  Ed Sullivan
October 24 –  Joe Moore
October 31 –  Irvine H. Page
November 7 –  Margaret
November 14 –  W. Averell Harriman
November 21 –  Keith Funston
November 28 –  Julie Harris
December 5 –  Theodore F. Adams
December 12 –  Louis Marx
December 19 –  LeRoy Collins
December 26 – Virgin and Child by Fra Angelico

1956

January 2 –  Harlow Curtice, Man of the Year
January 9 –  Sherman Adams
January 16 –  David Ben-Gurion
January 23 –  Rowland Hughes
January 30 – The Missile
February 6 –  Alfred Gruenther
February 13 –  Juscelino Kubitschek
February 20 –  Frank Lausche
February 27 –  William Holden
March 5 –  Luo Ruiqing
March 12 –  Leonard W. Hall
March 19 –  Pierre Poujade
March 26 –  James Eastland
April 2 –  Hussein bin Talal
April 9 –  Ralph Reed
April 16 –  Philip Graham
April 23 –  Sigmund Freud
April 30 –  Nikita Khrushchev
May 7 –  Ezra Taft Benson
May 14 –  Marilyn Monroe
May 21 –  Arleigh Burke
May 28 –  Robin Roberts
June 4 –  Charles Erwin Wilson
June 11 –   Jacques Barzun
June 18 –  Dwight D. Eisenhower
June 25 –  Eugene R. Black, Sr.
July 2 –   Eero Saarinen
July 9 –  David J. McDonald
July 16 –  Adlai Stevenson II
July 23 –  Rex Harrison
July 30 –  Jawaharlal Nehru
August 6 –  Stavros Niarchos
August 13 –  Harry S. Truman
August 20 –  Duke Ellington
August 27 –  Gamal Nasser
September 3 –  Arthur Langlie
September 10 –  William McChesney Martin
September 17 –  Estes Kefauver
September 24 –  John D. Rockefeller Jr.
October 1 –  Robert F. Wagner Jr.
October 8 –  Duffy Daugherty
October 15 –  Herman Talmadge
October 22 –  Leo Hoegh
October 29 –    Maria Callas
November 5 –  Richard Nixon
November 12 –  Dwight D. Eisenhower &  Richard Nixon
November 19 –  Anthony Eden
November 26 –  Dag Hammarskjöld
December 3 –  Parry O'Brien
December 10 –  Wladyslaw Gomulka
December 17 –   Carl-Gustaf Rossby
December 24 –  Edward Hopper
December 31 –  Paul A. Siple

1957

January 7 – Hungarian Patriot, Man of the Year
January 14 –  William Knowland
January 21 –  Harold Macmillan
January 28 –  Saud
February 4 –  Leonard Bernstein
February 11 –  Charles Van Doren
February 18 –  Martin Luther King
February 25 –  Arthur Radford
March 4 –  Christian Dior
March 11 –  David Ben-Gurion
March 18 –  Carrol M. Shanks
March 25 –  Charles Bailey
April 1 –  Bernard Schriever
April 8 –  Dave Beck
April 15 – The Dead Sea Scrolls
April 22 –  Mohammed V
April 29 –  Simon Ramo &  Dean Wooldridge
May 6 –  Hussein bin Talal
May 13 –  Herbert Brownell
May 20 –  Stefan Wyszynski
May 27 –  John McClellan
June 3 –  Pedro Aramburu
June 10 –  Henry Heald
June 17 –  Nuri as-Said
June 24 – Monster Machines
July 1 –  Earl Warren
July 8 –  Birdie Tebbetts
July 15 –  Norman Chandler
July 22 –  Nikita Khrushchev
July 29 –  Kim Novak
August 5 –  John Diefenbaker
August 12 –  Richard Russell Jr.
August 19 –  Alfried Krupp
August 26 –  Althea Gibson
September 2 –  James Cozzens
September 9 –  Jimmy Hoffa
September 16 –  Anastas Mikoyan
September 23 –  Orval Faubus
September 30 –  Edward R. Murrow
October 7 – Little Rock Integration
October 14 – The U.S. Repairman
October 21 –   Philip
October 28 –  Ludwig Erhard
November 4 –  George W. Walker
November 11 –  Lalla Aisha
November 18 –   Edward Teller
November 25 –  Thomas D. White
December 2 –  John F. Kennedy
December 9 –  Richard Nixon
December 16 –  Lauris Norstad
December 23 – U.S. Music Boom
December 30 –   Maria Schell

1958

January 6 –  Nikita Khrushchev, Man of the Year
January 13 –  Neil McElroy
January 20 –  Frank Pace
January 27 –  James Hagerty
February 3 –  Adnan Menderes
February 10 –  Bill Hartack
February 17 –   Wernher von Braun
February 24 –  J. Paul Getty
March 3 –  Theodore Roosevelt
March 10 –  Sukarno
March 17 –  Lyndon B. Johnson
March 24 – Wall Street Bull
March 31 –  Edward Durrell Stone
April 7 –  Franklin Clark Fry
April 14 –  John Gunther
April 21 –  Alec Guinness
April 28 –  Walter O'Malley
May 5 –  Charles Rhyne
May 12 – Harlow Curtice, Henry Ford II & Lester Colbert
May 19 –  Van Cliburn
May 26 –  Charles de Gaulle
June 2 –  Alexander Nesmeyanov
June 9 –  Michael Stepovich
June 16 –  Jean Thorn
June 23 –  Luis Muñoz Marín
June 30 –  Sherman Adams
July 7 –  Stephen Kennedy, NYC Police Commissioner
July 14 –  George Beadle
July 21 –  Robert Preston & Meredith Willson
July 28 –  Gamal Abdel Nasser
August 4 –  James L. Holloway, Jr.
August 11 –  Henry Cabot Lodge Jr.
August 18 –  Jack Paar
August 25 –  Robert Daniel Murphy
September 1 –  John Thach
September 8 –  Milton Eisenhower
September 15 –  Edmund Brown, Sr.
September 22 –  J. Lindsay Almond
September 29 –  Charles Goren
October 6 –  Nelson Rockefeller
October 13 –  Ferhat Abbas
October 20 –  Amos Stagg
October 27 –  Charles E. Chamberlain
November 3 –  Renata Tebaldi
November 10 –   Pope John XXIII
November 17 –  C. R. Smith
November 24 –  Democratic Hopefuls (Adlai Stevenson II, Hubert Humphrey, Stuart Symington, Lyndon B. Johnson, Robert B. Meyner, John F. Kennedy & Pat Brown)
December 1 –  Mao Tse-tung
December 8 –  Adolfo Mateos
December 15 –  Boris Pasternak
December 22 –  Miyoshi Umeki &  Pat Suzuki
December 29 – Wall Street Bull

1959

January 5 –  Charles de Gaulle, Man of the Year
January 12 –  Ralph J. Cordiner
January 19 – Space Exploration
January 26 –  Fidel Castro
February 2 –  Congressional leaders Wilbur Mills, John William McCormack, Clarence Cannon, Sam Rayburn & Howard W. Smith
February 9 – Alec Cushing
February 16 – Sekou Toure
February 23 – Telephone Man
March 2 –  Harry Belafonte
March 9 – Warren North
March 16 –  Paul Tillich
March 23 –  Michiko Shoda
March 30 – TV's Western Heroes
April 6 –  George W. Romney
April 13 –  Abdul Karim Kassem
April 20 – Dalai Lama
April 26 –  Christian A. Herter
May 4 –  James Van Allen
May 11 –  Lyman Lemnitzer
May 18 – Harsen Smith
May 25 –  Willy Brandt
June 1 – Dwight Robinson
June 8 –  Charles Halleck
June 15 –  Lewis Strauss
June 22 –  Shirley MacLaine
June 29 –  Queen Elizabeth II
July 6 –  Columbus Iselin II
July 13 –  Frol Kozlov
July 20 –  Roger Blough
July 27 –  Dr. John R. Heller Jr.
August 3 –  Richard Nixon
August 10 –  William F. Quinn
August 17 –  Jacques Soustelle
August 24 –  Rocky Colavito
August 31 –  James Hoffa
September 7 –  Dwight D. Eisenhower
September 14 – – James Bryant Conant
September 21 –  Henry Moore
September 28 –  Nikita Khrushchev
October 5 –  Edward N. Cole
October 12 –  Liu Shao-chi
October 19 –  Harold Macmillan
October 26 – TV's Private Eyes
November 2 –  Henry Clay Alexander
November 9 –  Stuart Symington
November 16 –  Robert Kintner
November 23 –  Robert Bernard Anderson
November 30 –  Sam Huff
December 7 –  Charles Mortimer
December 14 –  Jawaharlal Nehru
December 21 –  Anne Bancroft
December 28 – 18th-century Crèche

References

 Time magazine archives
 Time The Vault

Time magazine (1950s)
1950s
Cover of Time magazine